Marceline Desbordes-Valmore (20 June 1786 – 23 July 1859) was a French poet and novelist.

She was born in Douai. Following the French Revolution, her father's business was ruined, and she traveled with her mother to Guadeloupe in search of financial help from a distant relative. Marceline's mother died of yellow fever there, and the young girl somehow made her way back to France. At age 16, back in Douai, she began a career on stage. In 1817 she married her husband, the  "second-rate" actor Prosper Lanchantin-Valmore.

She published Élégies et Romances, her first poetic work, in 1819. In 1821 she published the narrative work Veillées des Antilles. It includes the novella Sarah, a contribution to the genre of slave stories in France.

Marceline appeared as an actress and singer in Douai, Rouen, the Opéra-Comique in Paris, and the Théâtre de la Monnaie in Brussels, where she notably played Rosine in Beaumarchais's Le Barbier de Séville. She retired from the stage in 1823. She later became friends with the novelist Honoré de Balzac, and he once wrote that she was an inspiration for the title character of La Cousine Bette.

The publication of her innovative volume of elegies in 1819 marks her as one of the founders of French Romantic poetry. Her poetry is also known for taking on dark and depressing themes, which reflects her troubled life. She is the only female writer included in the famous Les Poètes maudits anthology published by Paul Verlaine in 1884. A volume of her poetry was among the books in Friedrich Nietzsche's library.

Bibliography
Each year links to its corresponding "[year] in poetry" article:
 1819: Élégies et romances
 1825: Élégies et poésies nouvelles
 1833: Les Pleurs
 1839: Pauvres Fleurs
 1843: Bouquets et prières
 1860: Poésies inédites (posthumous)

Notes

External links 

 
 
 

People from Douai
1786 births
1859 deaths
French women novelists
French women poets
Poètes maudits
Burials at Montmartre Cemetery
19th-century French actresses
French stage actresses
19th-century French opera singers
19th-century women writers